Hans-Joachim "Hajo" Schuhmacher (born 20 November 1946) is a West German bobsledder who competed in the early 1980s. He won a silver medal in the four-man event at the 1983 FIBT World Championships in Lake Placid, New York.

Schuhmacher also finished ninth in the four-man event at the 1984 Winter Olympics in Sarajevo.

References

External links
1984 bobsleigh four-man results
Bobsleigh four-man world championship medalists since 1930

Bobsledders at the 1984 Winter Olympics
German male bobsledders
Living people
1946 births
Olympic bobsledders of West Germany